George Lester Jackson (September 23, 1941 – August 21, 1971) was an American author, activist and prisoner. While serving an indeterminate sentence for the armed robbery of a gas station in 1961, Jackson became involved in revolutionary activity and co-founded the prison gang Black Guerrilla Family.

In 1970, he was charged, along with two other Soledad Brothers, with the murder of correctional officer John Vincent Mills in the aftermath of a prison fight.  The same year, he published Soledad Brother: The Prison Letters of George Jackson, a combination of autobiography and manifesto addressed to an African-American audience. The book became a bestseller and earned Jackson personal fame. In 1971, Jackson was killed by prison guards during an escape attempt in which he and other inmates took hostages. Five of the hostages were killed; three correctional officers and two inmates.

Biography 

Born in Chicago, Illinois, Jackson was the second son of Lester and Georgia Bea Jackson's five children. He spent time in the California Youth Authority Corrections facility in Paso Robles due to several juvenile convictions including armed robbery, assault, and burglary.

In 1961, he was convicted of armed robbery – for stealing $70 
($ in current dollar terms) at gunpoint from a gas station – and sentenced to one year to life in prison.

During his first years at San Quentin State Prison, Jackson became involved in revolutionary activity. He was described by prison officials as egocentric and anti-social. In 1966, Jackson met and befriended W. L. Nolen, who introduced him to Marxist and Maoist ideology. The two founded the Black Guerrilla Family in 1966 based on Marxist and Maoist political thought. In speaking of his ideological transformation, Jackson remarked: "I met Marx, Lenin, Trotsky, Engels, and Mao when I entered prison and they redeemed me." In his 1972 book Blood in My Eye, Jackson describes himself as a "Marxist-Leninist-Maoist-Fanonist".

As Jackson's disciplinary infractions grew he spent more time in solitary confinement, where he studied political economy and radical theory. He also wrote many letters to friends and supporters, which would later be edited and compiled into the books Soledad Brother and Blood in My Eye, bestsellers that brought him a great deal of attention from leftist organizers and intellectuals in the U.S. and Western Europe. He amassed a following of inmates, including whites and Latinos, and most enthusiastically with other black inmates.

In January 1969, Jackson and Nolen were transferred from San Quentin to Soledad Prison. On January 13, 1970, corrections officer Opie G. Miller shot Nolen and two other black prisoners (Cleveland Edwards and Alvin Miller) during a yard riot with members of the Aryan Brotherhood, killing all three. Following Nolen's death, Jackson became increasingly confrontational with corrections officials and spoke often about the need to protect fellow inmates and take revenge on correction officers, employing what Jackson called "selective retaliatory violence".

On January 17, 1970, Jackson, Fleeta Drumgo and John Clutchette were charged with murdering a corrections officer, John V. Mills, who was beaten and thrown from the third floor of Soledad's Y wing. This was a capital offense and a successful conviction would have put Jackson in the gas chamber. Mills was purportedly killed in retaliation for the shooting deaths of three inmates by Miller the previous year. Miller had not been charged with any crime, as a grand jury ruled his actions during the prison fight justifiable homicide.

Marin County courthouse incident 

On August 7, 1970, George Jackson's 17-year-old brother Jonathan P. Jackson burst into a Marin County courtroom with an automatic weapon, freed prisoners James McClain, William A. Christmas and Ruchell Magee, and took Judge Harold Haley, Deputy District Attorney Gary Thomas, and three jurors hostage to demand the release of the "Soledad Brothers". Police killed Haley, Jackson, Christmas and McClain as they attempted to drive away from the courthouse. Eyewitness testimony suggests Haley was hit by fire discharged from a sawed-off shotgun that had been fastened to his neck with adhesive tape by the abductors. Thomas, Magee and one of the jurors were wounded. The case made national headlines.

Angela Davis, who owned the weapons used in the hostage taking, was later acquitted of conspiracy, kidnapping, and murder.  A possible explanation for the gun connection is that Jonathan Jackson was her bodyguard. Magee, the sole survivor among the attackers, eventually pleaded guilty to aggravated kidnapping and was sentenced to life imprisonment in 1975. Magee has been imprisoned for over 50 years.

Prison escape and death 

On August 21, 1971, Jackson met with attorney Stephen Bingham at San Quentin prison to discuss a civil lawsuit that Jackson had filed against the California Department of Corrections. After the meeting, Jackson was being escorted by officer Urbano Rubiaco back to his cell when Rubiaco noticed a metallic object in Jackson's hair, later revealed to be a wig, and ordered him to remove it. Jackson then pulled a Spanish Astra 9 mm pistol from beneath the wig and said: "Gentlemen, the dragon has come"—a reference to Ho Chi Minh. It is not clear how Jackson obtained the gun. Bingham, who lived for 13 years as a fugitive before returning to the United States to face trial, was acquitted of charges that he smuggled a gun to Jackson.

Jackson ordered Rubiaco to open all the cells and along with several other inmates, he overpowered the remaining correction officers and took them, along with two inmates, hostage. Five other hostages, officers Jere Graham, Frank DeLeon and Paul Krasnes, along with two white prisoners, were killed and found in Jackson's cell. Three other officers, Rubiaco, Kenneth McCray, and Charles Breckenridge, were also shot and stabbed, but survived. After finding the keys for the Adjustment Center's exit, Jackson along with fellow inmate and close friend Johnny Spain escaped to the yard where Jackson was shot dead from a tower and Spain surrendered.

Three inmates were acquitted and three (David Johnson, Johnny Spain and Hugo Pinell) were convicted for the murders. The six became known as the "San Quentin Six".

There is some evidence that Jackson and his supporters on the outside had planned the escape for several weeks. Three days before the escape attempt, Jackson rewrote his will, leaving all royalties as well as control of his legal defense fund to the Black Panther Party.

Jackson's funeral was held at St. Augustine's Episcopal Church in Oakland, California, on August 28, 1971.

In popular culture 

Several notable artists and entertainers have dedicated their work to Jackson's memory or created works based on his life. The avant-garde jazz group Art Ensemble of Chicago, affiliates of the Association for the Advancement of Creative Musicians, recorded and released the album A Jackson in Your House in Paris, France, in 1969. A non-album single was released by Bob Dylan, "George Jackson", about the life and death of Jackson. The song made the American charts peaking at No. 33 in January 1972. The ninth track of the 2011 Blue Scholars album Cinemetropolis is named for Jackson and references the Soledad Brothers.

Jackson and his attempted prison escape are the subjects of the first verse of the Joan Baez parody song, "Pull the Tregroes," on National Lampoon's 1972 album, Radio Dinner.

Steel Pulse, an English reggae band from Birmingham wrote a song named "Uncle George" that contains a chorus of "Soledad Brother". The song comes from the band's album Tribute To The Martyrs, which also honours other black civil rights activists including Nelson Mandela, Martin Luther King Jr. and Steve Biko.

The 1994 song Jettin' by the hip-hop trio Digable Planets references George Jackson as one of their black revolutionary heroes who died in prison.

Ja Rule named his 2003 album after Jackson's book Blood in My Eye. Saxophone player Archie Shepp dedicated most of his album Attica Blues (1972) to the story of George Jackson ("Blues for Brother George Jackson") and the Attica prison riots that followed. Stephen Jay Gould wrote, in his 1981 book The Mismeasure of Man, of George Jackson's death in context of "statistically supported" social Darwinism. Quoting Gould about the legacy of failed science which supported racial bigotry and physiognomy, "George Jackson ... died under Lombroso's legacy, trying to escape after eleven years (eight and a half in solitary) of an indeterminate one-year-to-life sentence for stealing seventy dollars from a gas station."

Jackson's life, beliefs and ultimate fate were the topic of one of the many audio tapes recorded at the Jonestown commune in Guyana during 1978. In the tape in question, Jim Jones touches on several issues relating to Jackson, most notably Jones' firm belief that Jackson's death was a racist assassination. His admiration for the Black Panther activist on the tape is as clear as his disgust that one of his followers, Willie Malone, could think he was remotely in the same league as Jackson, and that "punks" like Malone had sold him out. Jim Jones could later be heard beating Willie Malone, who was 15 years old at the time. 

Stanley Williams dedicated his 1998 book Life in Prison in part to George Jackson. In Governor Arnold Schwarzenegger's response to Williams' appeal for clemency, the governor claimed that this dedication was "a significant indicator that Williams is not reformed and that he still sees violence and lawlessness as a legitimate means to address societal problems."

"Soulja's Story" is a song by rapper 2pac, released on the 1991 album 2pacalypse Now, which makes reference to the Marin County Civic Center attacks.

The 2007 film Black August is a retelling of the last 14 months of Jackson's life.

See also 

 Frantz Fanon
 Fay Stender

References

Further reading 

 Soledad Brother: The Prison Letters of George Jackson (1970); 
 Blood In My Eye (1971); 
 Min S Yee. The Melancholy History of Soledad Prison; In Which a Utopian Scheme Turns Bedlam (1973); 
 Eric Mann. Comrade George; An Investigation into the Life, Political Thought, and Assassination of George Jackson (1974); 
 P. Collier and D. Horowitz; Destructive Generation (1996); 
 Jo Durden-Smith. Who Killed George Jackson? (1976); 
 d. "Black Lives, White Imaginaries" (2021), C O M P: An Interdisciplinary Journal.

External links 

 FBI file on George Jackson

Writings, interviews and advocacy of his views 
 "Soledad Brother: The Prison Letters of George Jackson" – online text of Jackson's 1970 book
 "Remembering the Real Dragon: An Interview with George Jackson" – by Karen Wald, May and June 1971
 "George Jackson: Black Revolutionary" – pro-Jackson article by Walter Rodney, November 1971
 A collection of George Jackson quotes

1941 births
1971 deaths
Activists for African-American civil rights
Activists from Chicago
African Americans shot dead by law enforcement officers in the United States
African-American communists
African-American writers
American autobiographers
American communists
American convicts who became writers
American Maoists
American Marxist writers
American Marxists
American people convicted of robbery
American people who died in prison custody
American revolutionaries
Anti-revisionists
COINTELPRO targets
Conspiracy theories in the United States
Criminals of the San Francisco Bay Area
Deaths by firearm in California
Gang members
Justifiable homicide
Members of the Black Panther Party
New Left
Prisoners who died in California detention